Xenarcturus is a monotypic genus of crustaceans belonging to the monotypic family Xenarcturidae. The only species is Xenarcturus spinulosus.

The species is found in Southern America.

References

Isopoda
Monotypic crustacean genera